Hydatina is a genus of sea snails, bubble snails, marine opisthobranch gastropod mollusks in the family Aplustridae.

Species 
Species within this genus include:
 Hydatina albocincta Van der Hoeven, 1839
 Hydatina cinctoria Perry, 1811 (color variant and synonym of Hydatina zonata).
 Distribution: South Africa
 Hydatina exquisita Voskuil, 1995
 Distribution: Marquesas Islands
 Length: 21 mm
 Description: very globose, thin shell with black and purplish spiral bands on body whorl and a narrow white band below the suture and at anterior end: anterior end of the columella is directed slightly to the right.
 Hydatina montilai Delsaerdt, 1996
 Distribution: Philippines.
 Hydatina physis (Linnaeus, 1758)
 Hydatina velum Gmelin, 1791 (probably color variant and synonym of Hydatina zonata)
 Distribution: Indian Ocean, East Africa
 Length: 25–50 mm
 Hydatina vesicaria (Lightfoot, 1786) brown-lined paper bubble
 Distribution: Florida, Mexico, Caribbean.
 Length: 17–45 mm
 Description: lives on the bottom at the depth of 8 m to 64 m; very fragile and delicate shell with fine brown spiral lines
 Hydatina zonata Solander in Lightfoot, 1786 zoned paper bubble
synonyms
 Hydatina amplustre Linnaeus, 1758 accepted as Aplustrum amplustre

Gallery

References

 
 Sea Slug Forum info
 Info on the genus

Aplustridae